Guideline or variant may refer to:

 guideline, a type of documentation
 S-75 Dvina, Soviet surface-to-air missile with the NATO reporting name "SA-2 Guideline"
 guide line, a line laid underwater to guide scuba divers back to a specific point
 Guidelines (film) 2014 Quebec film

See also
 Policy (disambiguation)

Disambiguation pages